Nikto may refer to:
 Nikto (Star Wars), a fictional species in the Star Wars franchise
 Nikto (vulnerability scanner), computer security software
 "Klaatu barada nikto", a phrase from the 1951 film The Day the Earth Stood Still